A nature documentary or wildlife documentary is a genre of documentary film or series about animals, plants, or other non-human living creatures, usually concentrating on video taken in their natural habitat but also often including footage of trained and captive animals. Sometimes they are about wildlife or ecosystems in relationship to human beings. Such programmes are most frequently made for television, particularly for public broadcasting channels, but some are also made for the cinema medium. The proliferation of this genre occurred almost simultaneously alongside the production of similar television series.

History

In cinema
Robert J. Flaherty's 1922 film Nanook of the North is typically cited as the first feature-length documentary. Decades later, Walt Disney Productions pioneered the serial theatrical release of nature-documentaries with its production of the True-Life Adventures series, a collection of fourteen full length and short subject nature films from 1948 to 1960. Prominent among those were The Living Desert (1953) and The Vanishing Prairie (1954), both written and directed by James Algar.

The first full-length nature-documentary films pioneering colour underwater cinematography were the Italian film Sesto Continente (The Sixth Continent) and the French film Le Monde du silence (The Silent World). Directed by Folco Quilici Sesto Continente was shot in 1952 and first exhibited to Italian audiences in 1954. The Silent World, shot in 1954 and 1955 by Jacques Cousteau and Louis Malle, was first released in 1956.

In television
In 1954, the BBC started airing Zoo Quest, featuring David Attenborough. Other early nature documentaries include Fur and Feathers shown on CBC from 1955 to 1956 and hosted by Ian McTaggart-Cowan., and Look, a studio-based BBC magazine-program with filmed inserts, hosted by Sir Peter Scott from 1955 to 1981. The first 50-minute weekly documentary series, The World About Us, began on BBC2 in 1967 with a color installment from the French filmmaker Haroun Tazieff, called "Volcano". Around 1982, the series changed its title to The Natural World, which the BBC Natural History Unit in Bristol continues to produce . In 1961, Anglia Television produced the first of the award-winning Survival series.

Between 1974 and 1980, the Spanish nature documentary television series El Hombre y la Tierra (The Man and the Earth), produced by TVE and presented by naturalist Félix Rodríguez de la Fuente used 35 mm film, which posed significant logistic and technical challenges at the time. The show gained international recognition.

During the late 1970s and early 1980s, several other television companies round the world set up their own specialized natural-history departments, including the Australian Broadcasting Corporation in Melbourne, Australia and TVNZ's unit in Dunedin, New Zealand — both still in existence, the latter having changed its name to "NHNZ". ITV's contribution to the genre, Survival, became a prolific series of single films. It was eventually axed when the network introduced a controversial new schedule which many commentators have criticized as "dumbing down".

Wildlife and natural history films have boomed in popularity and have become one of modern society's most important sources of information about the natural world. Yet film and television critics and scholars have largely ignored them.

The BBC television series Walking With, narrated by Kenneth Branagh, used computer-generated imagery (CGI) and animatronics to film prehistoric life in a similar manner to other nature documentaries. The shows (Walking with Dinosaurs, Walking with Beasts, and Walking with Monsters) had three spinoffs, two of which featured Nigel Marven: Chased by Dinosaurs and Sea Monsters: A Walking with Dinosaurs Trilogy. Robert Winston presented Walking with Cavemen.

Content

Overview
Most nature documentary films or television series focus on a particular species, ecosystem, or scientific idea (such as evolution). Although most take a scientific and educational approach, some anthropomorphise their subjects or present animals purely for the viewer's pleasure. In a few instances, they are in presented in ethnographic film formats and contain stories that involve humans and their relationships with the natural world, as in Nanook of the North (1922), The Story of the Weeping Camel (2003), and Grass: A Nation's Battle for Life (1925).

Although almost all have a human presenter, the role varies widely, ranging from explanatory voice-overs to extensive interaction or even confrontation with animals.

Most nature documentaries are made for television and are usually of 45 to 50 minutes duration, but some are made as full-length cinematic presentations.

Such films include:

 Among the Great Apes with Michelle Yeoh (2009)
 Animals Are Beautiful People (1974)
 Chang: A Drama of the Wilderness (1927)
 Coral Reef Adventure (2003)
 The Cove (2009)
 Encounters at the End of the World (2007)
 Grizzly Man (2005)
 The Last Paradises: On the Track of Rare Animals (1967)
 The Leopard Son (1996)
 The Living Desert (1953)
 March of the Penguins (2005)
 Microcosmos (1996)
 Sharkwater (2006)
 Serengeti Shall Not Die (1959)
 The Silent World (1956)
 The Story of the Weeping Camel (2003)
 Grass: A Nation's Battle for Life (1925)
 The Vanishing Prairie (1954)
 The Wild Parrots of Telegraph Hill (2003)
 White Wilderness (1958)
 Winged Migration (2001)
In addition, the BBC's The Blue Planet and Planet Earth series have both been adapted by BBC Worldwide and Greenlight Media for theatrical release.

In some cases, nature documentaries are produced in the short subject form and are subsequently screened in theaters or broadcast on television. Often they are about the relationship between humans and nature. Notable examples include:

 Agafia's Taiga Life (2013)
 Grand Canyon (1958)
 In Beaver Valley (1950)
 The Land (1942) 45-minute documentary made for the U.S. Department of Agriculture
 The Plow That Broke the Plains (1936)
 The River (1938)
 Seal Island (1948)

Every two years the Wildscreen Trust, of Bristol in the UK presents the Panda Awards for nature documentaries.

Criticism
The "naturalness" of nature documentaries has been disputed. Some, particularly those involving animals, have included footage of staged events that appear "natural" while actually contrived by filmmakers or occurring in captivity. In a famous example, Walt Disney's White Wilderness (1958), lemmings were herded to their deaths from a cliff by the filmmakers. Examples also occur in modern nature documentaries, such as Hidden Kingdoms (2014) and Blue Planet II (2017), indicating that such practices are still routine. Due to the difficulties of recording sounds on locations, it is common for nature documentary makers to record sounds in post-production using Foley and to use sound effect libraries. Compositing and computer-generated imagery are also sometimes used to construct shots. Wild animals are often filmed over weeks or months, so the footage must be condensed to form a narrative that appears to take place over a short space of time. Such narratives are also constructed to be as compelling as possible—rather than necessarily as a reflection of reality—and make frequent use of voice-overs, combined with emotional and intense music to maximise the audience's engagement with the content. One common technique is to follow the "story" of one particular animal, encouraging the audience to form an emotional connection with the subject and to root for their survival when they encounter a predator. In 1984, David Attenborough stated:There is precious little that is natural … in any film. You distort speed if you want to show things like plants growing, or look in detail at the way an animal moves. You distort light levels. You distort distribution, in the sense that you see dozens of different species in a jungle within a few minutes, so that the places seem to be teeming with life. You distort size by using close-up lenses. And you distort sound. What the filmmaker is trying to do is to convey a particular experience. … The viewer has to trust in the good faith of the filmmaker.Nature documentaries have been criticized for leaving viewers with the impression that wild animals survived and thrived after encounters with predators, even when they sustain potentially life-threatening injuries. They also cut away from particularly violent encounters, or attempt to downplay the suffering endured by the individual animal, by appealing to concepts such as the "balance of nature" and "the good of the herd".

Notable nature documentary filmmakers
Among the many notable filmmakers, scientists, and presenters who have contributed to the medium include:

 James Algar
 Sir David Attenborough
 William Henry “Harry” Butler AO CBE
 Gordon Buchanan
 Richard Brock 
 Jacques Cousteau
 Jeff Corwin
 Gerald Durrell
 Alastair Fothergill
 Robert Flaherty
 Félix Rodríguez de la Fuente
 Bernhard Grzimek
 Tim Haines
 Judy Irving
 Steve Irwin
 Hugo van Lawick
 Jasper James
 Nigel Marven
 Greg MacGillivray
 Ian McTaggart-Cowan
 Desmond Morris
 Neil Nightingale
 Marlin Perkins
 Coyote Peterson
 Cotee Peterson
 Jacques Perrin
 Louie Psihoyos
 Eugen Schuhmacher
 Heinz Sielmann
 Marty Stouffer
 Mark Strickson
 David Suzuki
 Valmik Thapar

List of notable nature documentary series
 Sir David Attenborough

Sir David Attenborough's contributions to conservation are widely regarded, and his television programs have been seen by millions of people throughout the world. Series narrated and/or presented by him include:
 
 Zoo Quest (1954–1964)Life on Earth (1979), 13 episodesThe Living Planet (1984), 12 episodesThe Trials of Life (1990), 12 episodesLife in the Freezer (1993), 6 episodesThe Private Life of Plants (1995), 6 episodesThe Life of Birds (1998), 10 episodesThe Blue Planet (2001), 8 episodesThe Life of Mammals (2002), 10 episodesLife in the Undergrowth (2005), 5 episodesPlanet Earth (2006), 11 episodesLife in Cold Blood (2008), 5 episodesLife (2009), 10 episodes
 Nature's Great Events (2009)Frozen Planet (2011), 7 episodesKingdom of Plants 3D (2012), 3 episodesDavid Attenborough's Conquest of the Skies 3D (2015), 3 episodes + ExtraPlanet Earth II (2016), 6 episodesBlue Planet II (2017), 7 episodesOur Planet (2019), 8 episodesSeven Worlds, One Planet (2019), 7 episodesThe Green Planet (2022), 5 episodesPrehistoric Planet (2022), 5 episodes 

Steve Irwin
Steve Irwin's documentaries, based on wildlife conservation and environmentalism, aired on Discovery Channel, and Animal Planet. The series comprises: The Crocodile Hunter (1992–2004), 74 episodesThe Crocodile Hunter: Collision Course (2002), MovieThe Crocodile Hunter's Croc Files (1999), 52 episodesTen Deadliest Snakes in the World (2001)The Crocodile Hunter Diaries (2001–2003), 30 episodesNew Breed Vets (2005), 6 episodesOcean's Deadliest (2006)

Other notable documentaries
In addition to those listed above, the following is a sampling of the genre:

 Andes to Amazon (2000)
 Animal Atlas (2004–)
 Ark on the Move (1982)
 Banded Brothers (2010)
 The Bear Family & Me (2011)
 Big Cat Week (2013)
 British Isles – A Natural History (2004)
 Corwin's Quest: Animal Planet 2005.
 Congo (2001)
 Cousins (2000)
 Dark Days in Monkey City (2009)
 Earth: The Power of the Planet (2007)
 Earthflight (2011)
 Escape to Chimp Eden (2008)
 Europe: A Natural History (2005)
 The First Eden (1987)
 The Future Is Wild (2002)
 The Great Rift: Africa's Wild Heart (2010)
 Ganges (2007)
 Great Migrations (2010)
 Going Wild with Jeff Corwin (Disney Channel, 1997–1999)
 El Hombre y la Tierra (1974–1981)
 How the Earth Was Made (2009)
 How the Universe Works (2010, 2012, 2014)
 The Human Animal (1994)
 Human Planet (2011)
 In the Womb (2005–2010)
 Insectia (1999)
 Inside Life (2009)
 The Jeff Corwin Experience (2001–2003)
 Journeys to the Ends of the Earth (1998)
 King of the Jungle (Animal Planet, 2003–2004)
 Land of the Tiger (1997)
 Last Chance to See (2009)
 Lemur Street (2007–2008)
 The Living Edens (1997)
 Madagascar (2011)
 Meerkat Manor (2005)
 The Most Extreme (2002)
 Nature (1982–)
 Natural World (1983–2020)
 The Nature of Things (1960–)
 Ocean Mysteries with Jeff Corwin (ABC, 2011–14)
 Oceans (2008)
 Orangutan Diary (2009)
 Orangutan Island (2007)
 Penguin Island (2010)
 Planet Earth: The Future (2006)
 Really Wild Animals (1993–98)
 Talking with Animals (2002)
 The Really Wild Show (1986–2006)
 River Monsters (2009)
 Saving Planet Earth (2007)
 Sea Rescue (2012–2018)
 The Secret Life of Elephants (2009)
 South Pacific (2009)
 State of the Planet (2000)
 The Stationary Ark (1975)
 The Predators of the Wild (1992–1996)
 Super Cats: A Nature Miniseries PBS (2018) – 3 Episodes
 Supernatural: The Unseen Powers of Animals (2008)
 Survival (1961)
 Suzuki on Science (1971)
 Weird Nature (2001)
 Wild Africa (2001)
 Wild Caribbean (2007)
 Wild Down Under (2003)
 Wild Kingdom (1963–1988)
 Wild Russia (2009)
 Yellowstone (2009)

Current production
In recent years, most traditional style 'blue chip' programming has become prohibitively expensive and are funded by a set of co-producers, usually a broadcaster (such as Animal Planet, National Geographic, or NHK) from one or several countries, a production company, and sometimes a distributor which then has the rights to sell the show into more territories than the original broadcaster.

Two recent examples of co-productions that were filmed by the BBC are Planet Earth II (2016) and Blue Planet II (2017).

Production companies are increasingly exploiting their filmed material, by making DVDs and Blu-rays for home viewing or educational purposes, or selling library footage to advertisers, museum exhibitors, and other documentary producers.

See also
 List of documentary films
 List of insect documentaries

Further reading
Bush, W. Stephen (1915) Wild Life in Films The Moving Picture World Vol 23 #10:1462-1463
Gregg Mitman: Reel Nature: America's Romance with Wildlife on Film (Weyerhaeuser Environmental Classics), Paperback (Second Edition), Combined Academic Publishers, 2009, 
Chris Palmer: Shooting in the Wild: An Insider's Account of Making Movies in the Animal Kingdom, Sierra Club Books, 2010, 

 References 

 External links 
 Light & Shadow Productions: German nature documentary company
 "The Mysterious Bee" An award winning documentary about Honey Bees
 Trouble in Lemur Land – a professional 50 minute HD film about illegal rosewood logging in Madagascar and the impact on the silky sifaka lemur
 List of Nature Documentaries
 Nature at BBC
 Nature at PBS
 TV/Radio Programmes at BBCOutdoors Country'', ca. 1957, Archives of Ontario YouTube Channel

 
Documentary film genres